The Washington Square Players (WSP) was a theatre troupe and production company that existed from 1915 to 1918 in Manhattan, New York City. It started as a semi-amateur Little Theatre then matured into a Repertory theatre with its own touring company and drama school, while maintaining its goal of presenting only works of artistic merit. It had a great amount of national newspaper coverage and sparked like-minded companies across the country, before it was forced to disband in 1918 due to wartime economic pressure and personnel shortages. Three of its original members would then found the longer-lived Theatre Guild having much the same purpose.

Purpose and plan
At the "Washington Square Bookshop" owned by the Boni brothers and the adjacent building housing the Liberal Club, an eclectic group of locals used to gather and criticize the state of American theatre. Sometime in late 1914 or early 1915 this group of creative types decided to join forces and produce their own plays. The company was formally organized in 1915, with playwright Edward Goodman as its director and Lawrence Langner as business manager. The New York Tribune reviewer of its first performance called it "Washington Square Players, Inc." and said its members were both professionals and semi-professionals. An article on the finances of the WSP from 1917 clarified its nature:
The Washington Square Players are a corporation, but they pay no dividends. That is, their stockholders are stockholders in name only, and there is a general understanding that all profits must be turned back into future productions.
According to a "manifesto" that was given out to the press, the company's goal was to present works of artistic merit, regardless of provenance though giving weight to American dramatists, that might not otherwise be performed in commercial theatres. New works by American playwrights were encouraged to be submitted, and new ideas for staging and setting would be considered. 

Their original venue was to be a barn in an alley off Washington Square. Unable to afford anywhere closer to Greenwich Village, the company took a sub-lease on the Bandbox Theatre, which seated less than 300. It stood at East 57th Street just east of Third Avenue in Manhattan. Originally Adolph Phillips' Theater, where German plays were presented, it was renamed by new owners who leased it to the "New York Play Actors" corporation, headed by Douglas J. Wood. They had the same idea as the WSP but charged $2 a seat and could not make it work, so they sublet to the WSP. 

The WSP plan was for performances to be given on Fridays and Saturdays only, for four weekends running. After these eight performances finished, a new program would be offered for the next four weeks. All seats were only 50 cents, a considerable discount over commercial theatres of the time. The troupe preferred tickets to be purchased on a subscriber basis rather than at performance time. One reviewer noted that Edna Ferber and Fola La Follette were subscribers. There were no salaried performers among the WSP that first season. All money raised went to the rent of the theatre, lighting, and other production expenses. The membership was described as composed of dramatic, musical, and literary people who lived in the "art colony" around Washington Square.

First season: Feb 1915-Jun 1915
The debut production was given on February 19, 1915, consisting of some one-act playlets and a pantomime, three of which had been written for the event. The program was preceded by a little charade between Edward Goodman and two shills in the audience, whose complaints about the tardy curtain raising allowed for exposition on what the WSP were trying to accomplish. Reviewers from major newspapers covered the opening night; all praised the performances and lauded the experiment it represented. One mentioned that the pantomime was performed by "young mimes gathered from the Italian quarter near the square". Another listed all twenty-seven performers by name, though without ascribing playlets or roles for most.

The Bandbox was filled completely for every subsequent performance of that first program. On one weekend, nearly 150 people were turned away from the box office, so that the first bill was extended for another week, with matinees and weekday performances added. For amateur performers, many who had other careers to pursue, this unexpected success was proving very demanding. The news about the debut of the WSP was also spread around the country in the drama columns of newspapers in other states.

The second bill presented by WSP was again a series of one-act playlets and a pantomime. Because of the first bill's extension its opening night was on March 26, 1915. There were three original works by WSP members, a classic by Leonid Andreyev, and a little-known playlet by John Reed. One of the previously announced playlets was not performed opening night due to the illness of its leading actress; its unknown whether it was ever performed.

The third program started on May 7, 1915, with four one-act playlets. Most successful according to reviewers was a Maurice Maeterlinck satire, in which St. Anthony appears at a modern funeral and resurrects the deceased to the dismay of the hopeful heirs. A social drama about self-sacrifice in the tenements by Rose Pastor Stokes was also praised. A previously announced pantomime failed to be presented. Once again extra performances had to be scheduled on weekdays to meet the demand.

The fourth and final bill of the season was presented starting May 25, 1915. It consisted of a one-act farce by Anton Chekov, plus repeats of three popular playlets from earlier bills. This program was for one week only, ending with two performances on May 31, 1915, for the Irish Theater of America was due to mount plays at the Bandbox starting June 1. However, the WSP was invited to perform their fourth program at the Little Theater in Philadelphia. They gave two performances there on June 5, 1915, dropping the Chekov farce of the fourth bill in favor of a Philip Moeller playlet from their second program.

Lectures and bookshop
During the first season, the WSP sponsored monthly lectures by Clayton Hamilton on Sunday afternoons at the Bandbox Theatre. Only the third and final topic is known: The Little Theater - How Can It Grow Up?.

An interesting feature of the tenancy of the WSP at the Bandbox (and later at the Comedy Theatre) was a small "bookshop" off the main lobby where copies of the plays presented could be purchased.

Second season: Oct 1915-May 1916
At the end of their first season, the WSP announced they had leased the Bandbox theatre for the coming season. The company would have full control of the theater instead of sub-letting it. They also announced some policy changes: the better seats would now cost $1 in order to provide some compensation for the artistic and production staff (just $20 per week to begin with, regardless of position, which rose considerably in later seasons), and performances would now be every evening plus a Saturday matinee. Boston drama critic Hiram Kelly Moderwell wrote an essay called Art and Buttered Bread which explained why the policy changes were beneficial. There would be a special subscriber list at $2 a performance which would subsidize keeping some seats at 50 cents, with all others going for a dollar.

Personnel changes
Ida Rauh, a founding member of the WSP, defected to the Provincetown Players after the first bill. Performer Samuel A. Eliot Jr left for Indianapolis to assume the leadership of the Little Theater Society of Indiana. Joining the company were Beverly Sitgreaves, who set up a small workshop in the Bandbox on dramatics and stagecraft for the WSP only, Grace Griswold as house manager, Lydia Lopokova, Frank Conroy, Glenn Hunter, and Roland Young.

Productions
The second season opened on October 4, 1915 at the Bandbox Theatre with four one-act plays, only one of which, Helena's Husband, was original and written by an WSP member. The New York Times reviewer thought it the best piece in an uneven bill, but savaged Ralph Roeder for his work in Roberto Bracco's A Night of Snow. Cleveland Rodgers, critic for the Brooklyn Daily Eagle, agreed and noted the program ran overly long with unexplained delays and poor settings. However, Hiram Kelly Moderwell was familiar with the Italian verismo style of Bracco, recognized that Roeder did an excellent job portraying a pretentious and disagreeable character, but acknowledged that American audiences were not yet ready for this sort of drama. Heywood Broun writing for the New York Tribune provided a complete cast list while heaping praise on Lydia Lopokova in The Antick. Finally, Aleck Woollcott in his column Second Thoughts on First Nights pronounced three of the playlets a success and expressed hope that the WSP would stick to one-act plays. Two weeks into the first bill, A Night of Snow was replaced by a popular first season revival, Interior.

For their second bill of the season the WSP presented four one-act comedies starting on November 8, 1915. Two of them, Whims by Alfred de Musset and The Honorable Lover by Roberto Bracco, were original translations from French and Italian by Ralph Roeder. Literature by Arthur Schnitzler and Overtones, written in 1913 by American Alice Gerstenberg, completed the quartet. The new program was presented Monday thru Thursday evenings, while the first bill of the season continued running on Friday and Saturday evenings and Saturday matinee for a few weeks. Heywood Broun found the comedies imaginative but felt they merged one into another, though he ranked Overtones as best. Aleck Woollcott felt Overtones was a clever idea whose execution could have been better; he ranked it and Literature as the two best performances. He also deflected protest at so much attention being given to the WSP by proclaiming "theirs is the only experimental theatre in New York". 

The third program for this season didn't appear until January 10, 1916. It consisted of three one-act plays and a pantomime in five scenes. Lydia Lopokova left the WSP before the third bill's premiere to resume dancing. The whimsical playlet The Roadhouse of Arden by Philip Moeller and the pantomime The Red Cloak by Josephine A. Meyer and Lawrence Langner were both original works, and proved the most successful for this bill. A dissenting view came from Heywood Broun, who thought Andre Tridon's translation of The Tenor by Frank Wedekind the best work, but noted the audience responded most to The Clod by Lewis Beach. Nearly all reviewers praised the sets by Lee Simonson and Robert Lawson.

The fourth program of the second season didn't start until March 20, 1916 but then ran for two months. It consisted of three American playlets and a 15th Century French farce. It also featured a new actress, Mary Morris, who graduated from apprentice to leading lady with this bill. The general consensus among reviewers was that this program was the strongest yet presented in terms of material, acting, and sets, and would have wide appeal. A plaintive note was sounded by Heywood Broun, when he questioned whether Children by Guy Bolton and Tom Carlton, or The Age of Reason by Cecil Dorrian (whom he referred to erroneously as "Mr. Dorrian") really belonged at the Bandbox as any more commercial theater would have been happy to stage them. Children according to critic Cleveland Rodgers, was "unmotivated melodrama, where you see people getting into the way of Fate's locomotive in order that they may be run over for your entertainment". Another reviewer was impressed with the urban tragedy of The Magical City by Zoe Akins, but thought the rhythm of the free verse meter in which it was written could hardly be detected. Pierre Patelin, an anonymous medieval work translated and adapted by Maurice Relonde, was judged an excellent presentation for its historicity as well for the sets by Lee Simonson. 

During April 1916 the WSP announced they had leased the larger Comedy Theatre for their next season, and would start giving longer plays. Their fifth and final bill for the second season began May 22, 1916, but only ran nine days, as the lease on the Bandbox Theatre expired June 1st. For the first time they performed a full length play, Chekhov's The Sea Gull. The Brooklyn Daily Eagle praised the production, particularly the acting of the leads, Roland Young (Constantine Treplieff) and Helen Westley (Irina Arkadina), but also mentioned Mary Morris, Ralph Roeder, and Florence Enright favorably.

Lectures
The WSP again sponsored occasional lectures at the Bandbox on Sunday afternoons. First up was Walter Prichard Eaton who spoke on The American Theatre: How the Land Lies. Second was Beverly Sitgreaves, who talked about Comparative Standards of Acting Here and Abroad. Third was Stuart Walker, who spoke about the Portmanteau Theatre repertory company he founded. Fourth came Josephine Clement from the Bijou in Boston to give A Theatre Workshop. Lastly, Mrs. Robert Seymour spoke about Synge and His Islands.

Summer season 1916
Upon taking possession of the Comedy Theatre, the WSP presented an encore selection of its most popular one-act playlets, starting June 5, 1916. Playing at a real Broadway theatre for the first time before a full house that included Diamond Jim Brady, the Washington Square Players proved their productions could please an audience more than twice the size of the Bandbox. The bill consisted of The Honorable Lover, Pierre Patelin, The Clod, and Helena's Husband, with much the same casting as their original performances.  Though the audiences were pleased, critic Charles Darnton liked only Mary Morris in The Clod, dismissing the other works as negligible and amateurly acted. The New York Times was more generous, praising the "freshness and vitality" of the bill and conceding the WSP had gained by the move, since they now had an orchestra to play between acts.

The WSP ended the first half of its summer season in June. Three of their best actors, Frank Conroy, Margaret Mower, and Harold Meltzer left the company during the following hiatus. The WSP resumed performances August 30, 1916 with another quartet of one-act plays from their past productions. These were Literature, The Miracle of St. Anthony, Eugenically Speaking, and The Bear. The Brooklyn Daily News considered Literature the best offering, with the other three as interesting failures, the Standard Union preferred The Miracle of St. Anthony, while the Times Union thought Eugenically Speaking received the most applause.

Third season: Oct 1916-May 1917
As was becoming a common occurrence with the WSP, promising actor Roland Young left for another production company. In fact, of the known leads for this season's first bill, only two had previously performed with the WSP. Professional actors now filled most leading roles at the Comedy, which led one reviewer to praise their "professional finish" and "ensemble excellence". An anonymous newspaperman, noting how many little theater companies had sprung up since the WSP started, suggested unused names for those yet to begin.

Touring company
During October the WSP formed a touring company, to play the existing repertoire of the company in other cities. The company presented two separate bills of playlets, on alternate days. The first bill had The Roadhouse of Arden, Eugenically Speaking, Literature, In April, and Helena's Husband, while the second consisted of A Bear, The Roadhouse of Arden, Interior, and Pierre Patelin. With such a varied program, the touring company had twenty members; a few were previous WSP players such as Ralph Roeder and Marjorie Deen, but most were newcomers.

The touring company opened in Newark at the Broad Street Theatre on October 23, 1916 for a week. It went to Washington DC for a week, then opened in Philadelphia at the Little Theater for a week on November 6, 1916. The company then returned to New York, giving one and two night performances on the way in Wilmington, Delaware, Allentown, Pennsylvania,  Trenton, New Jersey, and Scranton. 

The tour took a short break, then played the Lyceum Theatre at Ithaca, New York for two nights. The bill was altered slightly to substitute John Reed's Moondown for one of the two Roadhouse performances. Among the many performers listed was a WSP newcomer, Sam Jaffe. It moved on to the Lyceum in Rochester, New York a week later for three performances, where actor Charles Meredith was praised. It opened in Chicago's Playhouse on December 18, 1916 for a seven week engagement. While there, the Drama League enlisted the WSP to take the tour onto cities where it had local groups. The company rode the rails in February 1917, playing one night stands at St. Louis, Indianapolis, Atlanta, Louisville, Buffalo, Cincinnati, and many other cities. It returned to Manhattan in time for some of its members to join the casts of the third season's fourth bill.

Drama school
Reviving the short-lived drama workshop idea from the second season, the WSP sponsored Clare Tree Major in setting up the "School for Players" in the building across the street from the Comedy Theatre. The school opened October 2, 1916, drawing upon members of the WSP for general instruction, but also employing expert teachers for fencing, dancing, physical training, diction, and make up. The apprentices put on their first public performance at the Comedy Theatre on the afternoon of December 19, 1916. The bill included four one-act plays and a pantomime.

Scenic studio and costume shop
Within the same building as the School for Players the WSP, drawing on its artistic membership, set up a soon thriving business in creating stage scenery for other professional productions. This is where Lee Simonson, Robert E. Jones, Rollo Peters and others designed and created sets for both WSP productions and other shows. Raymond Hitchcock's Hitchy-Koo Revue of 1917 had fourteen sets created in this studio. By the end of the third season, both the Scenic studio and the Drama school had shown a profit, helping to cancel out some of the expense of the touring company.

That same six-story building also housed the costume shop for the WSP, where the costumers did their design work and sewing, and the wardrobes of costumes from prior productions. It is not known whether this shop served production companies other than the WSP.

Productions
The third season for the Washington Square Players opened at the Comedy Theatre on October 2, 1916. The first bill consisted of four one-act plays: A Merry Death by Nikolai Evreinov, translated from the Russian by C.E. Rechofer; Lover's Luck by Georges de Porto-Riche, translated from the French by Ralph Roeder; The Sugar House by Alice Brown; and Sisters of Susanna by Philip Moeller. Mary Coates, playing her first professional part in Sisters of Susanna, received an embarrassing gush of praise. Critic Charles Darnton was cutting about A Merry Death and Sisters of Susanna, but praised Lover's Luck.

The second bill opened on November 13, 1916 at the Comedy. It was again four one-act plays, two of which were recent American works. They were: Bushido by Takeda Isumo, an extract from an early 18th Century Japanese play, translated by Wolfgang von Gersdorf and Arthur Hohl, and produced with the aid of Michio Itō; Trifles by Susan Glaspell; Another Way Out by Lawrence Langner; and Altruism by Karl Ettlinger, translated from German by Benjamin F. Glazer. Both The New York Times and the New York Herald thought Bushido the best of the program, with the satire of premarital habitation in Another Way Out second best. The Brooklyn Daily Eagle appreciated the subtle power of the tragic Trifles and rated it first. Heywood Broun was honest enough to admit that like the other critics he left the theatre before Altruism had started, as Bushido ran so long. Broun gave the complete casts for the first three playlets. At the very bottom of the seventeen credited performers for Bushido is listed a newcomer to the WSP, Katharine Cornell. This was likely her first professional stage performance; thanks to newspaper deadlines, whether she also appeared in Altruism is unknown. This bill was the most successful of all WSP productions, a fact celebrated with a gala evening on February 6, 1917 for its 100th performance.

The third program of the season opened February 12, 1917, with four one-act plays. The New York Herald thought all four playlets good, with French actor José Ruben in A Private Account being called "the greatest find the Washington Square Players have made this season". (There was no mention made of the young actress playing the Third Servant in The Death of Tintagiles).  The Brooklyn Daily Eagle was less charitable, dismissing The Last Straw and The Hero of Santa Maria as obvious, The Death of Tintagiles as of appeal only to morbid adolescents, while noting A Private Account had already been performed at another theatre that year. 

On March 12, 1917 the Comedy Theatre was dedicated to a week-long benefit for the Women's Suffrage Party. Two plays from the third bill were retained, The Hero of Santa Maria and The Death of Tintagiles, while two encore presentations, Trifles and Lover's Luck were added for the fund raising drive.

The fourth bill of the season opened on March 21, 1917, with three plays: Sganarelle by Molière and The Poor Fool by Hermann Bahr were both one-act works, Plots and Playwrights was an original two-act play by Edward Massey. Massey's work, a satire on how commercial theater warps real stories, drew the most attention from the Brooklyn Daily Eagle reviewer, who also thought Philip Moeller's translation of Sganarelle into rhyming couplets was "mostly foolish". The Sun's reviewer said The Poor Fool couldn't be heard clearly and what did come through baffled the audience, and that only Plots and Playwrights was worth viewing. The New York Times agreed with the other newspaper reviewers, and suggested the order of plays on the bill be reversed, which was duly done three weeks later. 

For their fifth and final bill of the third season the WSP went with a single full-length play, Ibsen's Ghosts. It opened on May 7, 1917 at the Comedy Theatre for what was supposed to be a one week run but due to demand turned into three weeks. Mary Shaw was brought in to play "Mrs. Alving", a role she had first performed eighteen years prior. Aleck Woollcott had unstinted praise for José Ruben as "Oswald Alving", slightly less for Mary Shaw, and hardly any for the other three players. Heywood Broun concurred about Ruben's acting, but felt T.W. Gibson was far better than Shaw, whose gestures seemed stilted or old-fashioned. Like Woollcott, Broun felt Arthur Hohl didn't seem to know his lines, and Margaret Mower was merely "adequate".

Summer season 1917
The summer season opened on May 28, 1917 with two works from the WSP repertoire and a revival of Strindberg's one-act Pariah. Another Way Out and Plots and Playwrights completed the bill, with much the same casts as their prior performances at the Comedy, save for José Ruben, who had departed the WSP. The Brooklyn Daily Eagle reviewer liked all three and said the large audience did too. This first bill of the summer closed June 30, 1917 after which the WSP took its annual vacation.

Instead of a program of one-act plays for the second part of the summer, the WSP co-produced a play with Edward L. George, presented at the Comedy Theatre on September 19, 1917. This three-act satire, The Family Exit by Lawrence Langner, featured actors from outside the WSP.

Fourth season: Oct 1917-June 1918
The WSP had problems mounting another subscription season, delaying the opening several times. Wartime requisitioning of strategic materials raised prices and impacted both the theaters and the newspapers that covered them. Newspaper coverage of the WSP and other theater groups grew sparse as war news crowded them for space. During October 1917 the WSP sublet the Comedy Theatre to another production company, which presented a melodrama, The Barton Mystery, again with outside actors. For this month, the WSP temporarily become what it originally set out to counter, a commercial enterprise mounting a popular low-brow work purely for revenue to keep going.

Productions
The program of four one-act plays which finally opened on October 31, 1917, had Eugene O'Neill's In the Zone, The Avenue by Fenimore Merrill, Blind Alleys by Grace Latimer Wright, and His Widow's Husband by Jacinto Benavente. All four plays had sets designed by Rollo Peters. The New York Times especially liked the O'Neill play, and its lead actor Frederick Roland, who had parts in two other plays as well. The Evening World critic also liked In the Zone and spent his entire column on it, saying at the end only that the three other works "are plays of no importance". The Brooklyn Citizen and The Sun liked The Avenue, which displayed a fifth avenue dress shop window while the proprietor, shop girls, and customers carried on their cruelties and intrigues, ending with the three "mannequins" in the window coming to life, glad they are not human. Blind Alleys, Katherine Cornell's first leading role, concerned a romantic tragedy between husband and wife and the failure to heed intuition. The Sun felt it was too obscure, but The New York Times praised Cornell's performance. Only reviewer Ralph Block described and liked His Widow's Husband, though he too singled out Cornell and Westley in Blind Alleys. 
 
The second bill of the season opened on December 3, 1917. There were three one-act plays: Neighbors by Zona Gale, The Girl in the Coffin by Theodore Dreiser, and The Critic's Comedy by Samuel Kaplan. Also on the bill was a pantomime, a retelling of a Mayan folk legend called Yum Chapab, by J. Garcia Pimental and Beatrice de Holtoir. The Sun liked Gale's gentle rural tragedy, while The New York Times felt it had tempo issues. Both reviewers liked the Kaplan play, especially for Helen Westley's performance as the disillusioned drama critic. Critics Charles Darnton and Cleveland Rodgers and The Times reviewer all singled out the Dreiser play, with its subtext of death from a botched abortion as the best work on the program. During this bill the WSP reduced the price of all tickets by half and announced they would pay the "war tax" (evidently a surcharge on entertainment) themselves.

The third program of the WSP season opened on January 21, 1918, without the services of Katherine Cornell, who had gone to the Bonstelle company in her hometown of Buffalo, New York. As a replacement, the WSP drew on the head of their drama school, Clare Tree Major, to make her first performances in America. Where the previous program had been billed as "All-American" for its authors, the new bill was labelled "All New York". The four playlets were: Suppressed Desires by husband and wife George Cram Cook and Susan Glaspell; Habit by Frank Dare; The Sandbar Queen by George Cronyn; and Pokey by the WSP's own Philip Moeller. The Brooklyn Daily Eagle reviewer thought the bill weaker than usual for having no dramas to leaven the four comedies, but thought Suppressed Desires the best work and Pokey the weakest. The Times Union reviewer thought the bill the best ever presented by the WSP, and Pokey the highpoint. 

A three-act play formed the fourth bill for the WSP subscription season. Youth by Miles Malleson had its US debut at the Comedy Theatre on February 20, 1918. Florence Enright had been lent out to the Schubert Organization for Petticoats, so the two female roles were handled by Marjorie Vonnegut and Helen Westley. The main character would be played by newcomer Saxon Kling, with Arthur Hohl, Robert Strange, and Edward Balzerit supporting. The setting is the backstage of a theatre, where amidst the usual chaos of mounting a new play, the young playwright decries marriage and espouses free love with the young actress, who agrees until a complication sets in. The critic for the New York Herald was favorable to the presentation, but thought the playwright must already have outgrown the social ideals argued for in the play. Heywood Broun, while admiring the acting, pointed out the awkward mixed genre of the play, a light-hearted farce in the first act suddenly turns into a serious dialectical in the following two. After the opening week, Suppressed Desires from the third bill was added on to the end of Youth.

The WSP announced its fifth bill of the season as opening March 11, 1918 for a two week run only. This time Shaw's Mrs Warren's Profession would be the only play on the program, with Mary Shaw again as the visiting lead. The play was a revival in New York, though its previous productions there had been brief, as recounted by the Times Union reviewer:
In 1905 the police put an end to what might have been a long run the day after the premiere. Two years later another attempt was made to give the play. This time it is presented as the fifth subscription bill of the Washington Square Players. Policemen were present, but said nothing and did nothing. 
The New York Tribune critic was pleased with the acting, particularly that of Mary Shaw and Diantha Pattison, and reminded readers the latter's character ("Vivian Warren") had been termed a "female Bernard Shaw" by William Archer. Every performance was sold out, and the run was repeatedly extended.

An unprecedented sixth program of the WSP season opened on April 22, 1918. This consisted of three one-act plays: Salome by Oscar Wilde, The Home of the Free by Elmer Reizenstein , and Lonesome Like by Harold Brighouse, using many guest actors. Heywood Broun thought the acting in Lonesome Like the best on the bill, but gave a devastating review of Salome and its lead, Madame Yorska, whom he likened to the little sister Jane in Seventeen. The Brooklyn Daily Eagle, equally critical of the supporting acting in Salome, gave some mild praise to Madame Yorska then nuanced her to death. The same reviewer thought the Reizenstein work amusing, liked the fine acting of Lonesome Lake, but questioned whether such an often performed work should be mounted by the WSP. Charles Darnton also praised Lonesome Lake, dismissed The Home of the Free as "cheap and vulgar, without being funny", and was nearly as tough as Broun with the acting of Salome. Broun's savagely funny take on Mme. Yorska provoked a response from the WSP that he obligingly printed in a column. The WSP would have done better to ignore his review; a week later Salome was dropped from the bill and replaced by two new one-act plays.

While Lonesome Like and The Home of the Free continued running, Close the Book by Susan Glaspell and The Rope by Eugene O'Neill were added on May 13, 1918, both from the repertory of the Provincetown Players. Heywood Broun thought both plays were good, but that The Rope had been better acted by the amateurs of the Provincetown Players than the semi-professionals of the WSP.

Dissolution
On May 18, 1918, the Washington Square Players closed the last bill of their last season. Twelve of their members were already in military service, and more were going soon. When the Comedy Theatre was ordered shut, rumors of financial issues circulated. These were denied at first by company officials, who pointed to a planned summer season in San Francisco. However, within a few days Edward Goodman announced that the WSP had made a "voluntary assignment" with its creditors. 

An unsigned article in the New York Tribune summed up the failure of their experiment: "The Washington Square Players sold their amateur birthright for the chance of Broadway". However, three of the WSP original founding members, Philip Moeller, Helen Westley, and Lawrence Langner would join with Theresa Helburn to carry forward the experiment with  the foundation of the Theatre Guild later in 1918.

Revival of name
The name "Washington Square Players" was revived in the 1920's in association with New York University (NYU) Drama School productions. It was not a formal organization, but a label used by NYU students, the theatre community, and the press.

Stage performances

Notes

References
  The Concise Oxford Companion to the Theatre, Ed. Phyllis Hartnoll and Peter Found, Oxford University Press, (1996).

External links 

 Washington Square Players designs, posters and scripts, 1915-1918, held by the Billy Rose Theatre Division, New York Public Library for the Performing Arts
 Finding aid to the Randolph Somerville papers, 1915-1958, at Columbia University. Rare Book & Manuscript Library.

20th-century theatre
1914 establishments in New York City
1918 disestablishments in New York (state)
Defunct Theatre companies in New York City